Glen Burnie is a historic home located at Winchester, Virginia.  It consists of a -story central section built in two sections about 1794, with flanking two-bay, two-story wings built in 1959.  It is a brick dwelling in the Georgian style.

Built in 1794 by Robert Wood, son of James and Mary Wood. James founded Frederick Town (later Winchester) in 1744.

It was added to the National Register of Historic Places in 1979.

The house is now part of the Museum of the Shenandoah Valley.

Gallery

References

External links

Glen Burnie, 801 Amherst Street, Winchester, Winchester, VA: 19 data pages at Historic American Buildings Survey

Historic American Buildings Survey in Virginia
Houses on the National Register of Historic Places in Virginia
Georgian architecture in Virginia
Houses completed in 1794
Houses in Winchester, Virginia
National Register of Historic Places in Winchester, Virginia
1794 establishments in Virginia